Keith Alan Parsons (born 2 May 1973) is an English cricketer who played first-class for Somerset between 1992 and 2008. He is a right-handed batsman and right-arm medium pace bowler.

Parsons made his first-class debut in 1992 against the Pakistanis and his Championship debut the next season. He scored 6 first-class centuries including 193 not out against the West Indians in 2000 and a Championship best of 153 against Essex in 2006. His best bowling was 5–13 against Lancashire in 2000.

Parsons received his county cap in 1999 and had a benefit year in 2004. On 11 August 2008 he retired from first-class cricket having not represented the Somerset first-team during the 2008 season. Parsons retires being only the second person in Somerset history (alongside Ian Botham) to score 5,000 runs and take 100 wickets in both first-class and List A cricket.

Parsons played Minor County cricket for Cornwall in 2009 before being appointed captain of the Unicorns cricket team which will play in the inaugural Clydesdale Bank 40 limited over competition.

He has a twin brother, Kevin, who played for Somerset in seven one-day games.

References

External links

Somerset County Cricket Club Pen Picture

Somerset cricketers
Cornwall cricketers
English cricketers
Unicorns cricketers
1973 births
Living people
Sportspeople from Taunton
Twin sportspeople
English twins